The 1932 Wimbledon Championships took place on the outdoor grass courts at the All England Lawn Tennis and Croquet Club in Wimbledon, London, United Kingdom. The tournament was held from Monday 20 June until Saturday 2 July 1932. It was the 52nd staging of the Wimbledon Championships, and the third Grand Slam tennis event of 1932. Ellsworth Vines and Helen Moody won the singles titles.

Finals

Men's singles

 Ellsworth Vines defeated  Bunny Austin, 6–4, 6–2, 6–0

Women's singles

 Helen Moody defeated  Helen Jacobs, 6–3, 6–1

Men's doubles

 Jean Borotra /  Jacques Brugnon defeated  Pat Hughes /  Fred Perry, 6–0, 4–6, 3–6, 7–5, 7–5

Women's doubles

 Doris Metaxa /  Josane Sigart defeated  Helen Jacobs /  Elizabeth Ryan, 6–4, 6–3

Mixed doubles

 Enrique Maier /  Elizabeth Ryan defeated  Harry Hopman /  Josane Sigart, 7–5, 6–2

References

External links
 Official Wimbledon Championships website

 
Wimbledon Championships
Wimbledon Championships
Wimbledon Championships
Wimbledon Championships